Lieutenant Colonel Teófilo Marxuach, (July 28, 1877 – November 8, 1939), was the person who ordered the first shots fired in World War I on behalf of the United States on an armed German supply ship trying to force its way out of the San Juan Bay. Marxuach ordered hostile shots from a machine gun and a cannon located at the Santa Rosa battery of "El Morro" fort, in what is considered to be the first shots of World War I fired by the regular armed forces of the United States against any ship flying the colors of the Central Powers, forcing the Odenwald to stop and to return to port, where its supplies were confiscated.

Early years
Marxuach (birth name "Teófilo Marxuach Plumey") was born in the town of Arroyo, Puerto Rico when the island was still under Spanish rule. His parents were José María Marxuach, twice mayor of San Juan and Josefina Plumey Irizarry (daughter of Juan Bautista Plumey and Petronila Irizarry, among the wealthiest landholders in Lares). His family had historically played a prominent role in the island's commercial and political affairs. Marxuach and his three siblings Acisclo, Teresa (mother of Puerto Rican radio pioneer Teófilo Villavicencio) and Amalia were raised and educated in the capital city of San Juan. He studied military engineering at the Academy of Military Engineering in Guadalajara, Spain from September 1895 to July 1900 and graduated with a degree in civil engineering with a lieutenant's commission in the Spanish Army. When he returned to Puerto Rico in 1901, the island was a United States territory and no longer a Spanish province. Marxuach resigned his commission in the Spanish army and his Spanish citizenship. He then began to work as a civil engineer in the Department of Public Works. He enrolled in Cornell University and continued his engineering studies from 1902 to 1903. In 1903, Marxuach wrote and published "El lenguaje castellano en Puerto Rico" ("The Spanish Language in Puerto Rico"). In 1906, he married Carolina Acosta y Acosta (b. 1887), granddaughter of José Julián Acosta y Calvo in "La Capilla del Cristo" (Cristo Chapel) in Old San Juan. They had three children: Teófilo, Gilberto and Raúl Marxuach Acosta.

Military career with the United States

Puerto Rico became a U.S. Territory after the 1898 Treaty of Paris, which ended the Spanish–American War. The United States appointed a military governor, and the United States Army established itself in San Juan. The Army Appropriation Bill created by an Act of Congress on March 2, 1889 authorized the creation of the first body of native troops in Puerto Rico. On June 30, 1901, the Porto Rico Provisional Regiment of Infantry was organized. On July 1, 1901, the United States Senate passed a bill that required a strict mental and physical examination for those who wanted to join the regiment. Under the provisions of an act of Congress approved April 23, 1904 and of Circular No. 34, War Department, July 29, 1904, the recruitment of native Puerto Rican civilians to be appointed the grade of second lieutenants for a term of four years was approved with the condition that they pass the required tests.

Although many civilians from all walks of life applied for the officers appointment in January 1905, only seven made it that day, and one of those seven was Teófilo Marxuach, who had from 1903 to 1905 worked as a civil engineer for the Porto Rico regiment in the Aqueduct of Cayey. On March 3, 1905, he was commissioned with the rank of second lieutenant. An act of Congress, approved on May 27, 1908, reorganized the regiment as part of the "regular" Army. Because the native Puerto Rican officers were Puerto Rican citizens and not citizens of the United States, they were required to undergo a physical examination to determine their fitness for commissions in the regular army and to take an oath of U.S. citizenship with their new officers' oaths. In June 1908, Lt. Marxuach and all the others passed. He was assigned to the unit in charge of the Progressive Military Map of Puerto Rico from July 12, 1908 to December 4, 1908, during which time he was promoted to the rank of first lieutenant.

The first shot of the United States in World War I

The United States tried to remain neutral when World War I broke out in August 1914. However, Washington insisted on its neutral right to send ships without them being attacked by German submarines. American ships carried food and raw materials to Britain.

By January 30, 1908, the Porto Rico Regiment of Infantry was stationed at Camp Las Casas in Santurce, San Juan, Puerto Rico. Different units were stationed at other forts throughout the island and Lt. Marxuach was stationed at El Morro Castle, (then an Army base named Fort Brooke) at San Juan Bay. On March 21, 1915, Lt. Marxuach was the officer of the day at El Morro Castle. The Odenwald, built in 1903 (not the German World War II warship of the same name), was an armed German supply ship which tried to force its way out of San Juan Bay and deliver supplies to the German submarines waiting in the Atlantic Ocean. Lt. Marxuach gave the order to open fire on the ship from the walls of the fort. Sergeant Encarnacion Correa then manned a machine gun located along the wall below "La Fortaleza", the governor's residence, and fired warning shots at the ship with little effect. Marxuach then fired a cannon of the Santa Rosa battery in the upper platform of El Morro, in what is considered to be the first shot of World War I fired by the regular armed forces of the United States against any ship flying the colors of the Central Powers, forcing the Odenwald to stop and to return to port, where its supplies were confiscated. The shots ordered by Lt. Marxuach were the first fired by the United States in World War I prior to the official U.S. Congress declaration of war against Germany. The first shots fired after the U.S. Congress declared war on Germany on April 7, 1917 were by U.S. Marines in Apra Harbor, Guam against a launch from the SMS Cormoran.

International incident

Marxuach's actions became an international incident when the German government accused the United States government of the holding the Odenwald illegally against its will without firing the customary warning shot as required by international law. The United States government responded that the official report of the United States War Department made by Lt. Col. Burnham, the commander of the fortress of El Morro Castle, made it clear that only warning shots were made and that none were aimed at the Odenwald.  
Eventually, the Odenwald was refitted and renamed SS Newport by the U.S. government and assigned to the U.S. Shipping Board, where it served until 1924, when it was retired. In 1917, the Germans resumed the practice of unrestricted submarine warfare, in part leading to America's entry into the war.

Service in the Panama Canal Zone
On April 6, 1917, the U.S. Congress declared war on Germany and on May 14, 1917, the Porto Rico Regiment was sent to Panama, where Marxuach served at the commanding post at Camp E.S. Otis in defense of the Panama Canal Zone as captain of the infantry. While serving in Panama, he was promoted twice: on June 25, 1918, he was promoted to major, and on September 10 of the same year, he was promoted to the rank of lieutenant colonel. The regiment returned to Puerto Rico in March 1919 and was renamed The 65th Infantry by the Reorganization Act of June 4, 1920. During his military career, Marxuach served at various posts in Puerto Rico.

Later years

Marxuach retired on June 30, 1922, with the rank of lieutenant colonel. He continued to serve with the Organized Reserves of Puerto Rico until November 4, 1922. Upon his retirement, Marxuach worked as a civil engineer for the Department of Interior, in a project known as the Salto de Comerio. Marxuach also worked in the customs building in Old San Juan. Lt. Col. Teófilo Marxuach died in San Juan, Puerto Rico on November 8, 1939, and was buried with full military honors in Santa Maria Magdalena de Pazziz Cemetery in Old San Juan. He was survived by his widow Carolina Acosta Marxuach, three children, his brother Acisclo, and two sisters Teresa and Amalia.

His death not only made news in the local news media of the day, but was posted under the headlines "Lt. Col. Marxuach, World War Figure" in the November 9, 1939 edition of The New York Times. At the family's request, his body was exhumed and on May 3, 1957, and was buried in the Puerto Rico National Cemetery located in Bayamón, Puerto Rico, next to his son Colonel Gilberto José Marxuach (1910–1957) known as "The Father of the San Juan Civil Defense".

Military decoration

Congressional Gold Medal

On June 10, 2014, President Barack Obama, signed the legislation known as  "The Borinqueneers CGM Bill" at an official ceremony. The Bill honors the 65th Infantry Regiment with the Congressional Gold Medal.

Notes

See also
 
List of Puerto Ricans
List of Puerto Rican military personnel
Puerto Ricans in World War I
65th Infantry
Borinqueneers Congressional Gold Medal
 French immigration to Puerto Rico
 Other members of the Marxuach family

References

Further reading
 Puertorriquenos Who Served With Guts, Glory, and Honor. Fighting to Defend a Nation Not Completely Their Own, by Greg Boudonck. 

1877 births
1939 deaths
People from Arroyo, Puerto Rico
Puerto Rican people of Catalan descent
Puerto Rican people of French descent
Cornell University alumni
United States Army officers
Puerto Rican Army personnel
People from San Juan, Puerto Rico
Puerto Rican military officers
Spanish military personnel
United States Army personnel of World War I